Gyspy Woman is the first extended play by Greek singer Eleni Foureira. Hit Channel reported on 14 May 2019. that the EP was going to be released exclusively to Spotify on 17 May 2019 with 5 tracks, a cover of Crystal Waters 1991 song "Gypsy Woman", that Foureira performed at the 2019 MAD Walk event in April, as well as four original songs. On 30 May 2019, it was released on other streaming services. "El Ritmo Psicodélico" acted as a single, a lyric video was released to YouTube on 19 June 2019 and Eleni performed the song at the 2019 MAD Video Music Awards event in July.

Reception 
ESCxtra called the EP a fusion of reggaeton and Latin beats. Wiwibloggs wrote that "Gypsy Woman is a series of dance floor bangers that is bound to get you moving to el ritmo.". Press Party wrote about Call Ya specifically, and wrote about the song "the pounding drums, maracas and slinky horns on ‘Call Ya’ give this record all the feels of the Mediterranean. Produced and co-written by A.M. SNiPER., the record is vibrant, sexy and embodies everything that you can come to expect of Eleni Foureira’s music and demeanor". Culture Fix called Barcelona and Maria "immediate bops".

Tracklist

Videos

Performances

Lyric video

Charts

Release history

References 

Eleni Foureira albums
2019 EPs
Panik Records albums
Song recordings produced by Claydee